Viscount Monsell, of Evesham in the County of Worcester, was a title in the Peerage of the United Kingdom. It was created on 30 November 1935 for the Conservative politician Bolton Eyres-Monsell. The title became extinct on the death of his son, the second Viscount, in 1993.

Viscounts Monsell (1935)
Bolton Meredith Eyres-Monsell, 1st Viscount Monsell (1881–1969)
Henry Bolton Graham Eyres-Monsell, 2nd Viscount Monsell (1905–1993)

Arms

References

Extinct viscountcies in the Peerage of the United Kingdom
Noble titles created in 1935
Noble titles created for UK MPs